Ziva Postec: The Editor Behind the Film Shoah is a Canadian documentary film, directed by Catherine Hébert and released in 2018. The film is a portrait of Ziva Postec, an Israeli film editor most noted for her work on the 1985 Holocaust documentary film Shoah.

The film premiered on November 15, 2018, at the Montreal International Documentary Festival, before screening commercially in March 2019.

Annie Jean won the Prix Iris for Best Editing in a Documentary, and the film was a nominee for Best Documentary Film, at the 22nd Quebec Cinema Awards.

References

External links 
 

2018 films
2018 documentary films
Canadian documentary films
Quebec films
2010s Canadian films